The South Africa A cricket team toured Zimbabwe in April and May to play three List-A matches and five Twenty20 matches against the Zimbabwe XI cricket team. All the matches were played at Harare Sports Club in Harare.

Zimbabwe XI won the first Unofficial ODI by 5 runs due to DLS method as the play was stopped after 48.5 overs due to Bad light. 2nd Unofficial ODI was also interrupted by rain twice. South Africa A's innings was reduced to 46.5 overs with South Africa scoring 266 runs thanks to Reeza Hendricks 102 runs. Zimbabwe XI initially were given a target of 283 runs in 46 overs by applying DLS method. But it was again reduced to 145 runs from 20 overs as play had to stopped due to rain for 2nd time. Eventually South Africa won the 2nd Unofficial ODI by 51 runs levelling the series 1–1 with one match to be played. South Africa A went on to win the 3rd Unofficial ODI by 36 runs and won the List-A series by 2–1.

South Africa A maintained their win campaign by winning the T20 series 4–1.

Squads

Ahead of the tour, Lutho Sipamla returned home to South Africa due to an aggravation to the injury which he had suffered during South Africa's Test matches against Bangladesh. Glenton Stuurman was named his replacement. Prenelan Subrayen was ruled out of SA A squad for the List-A series due to testing COVID-19 positive. Wihan Lubbe was added to SA A squad for the LA series replacing Prenelan.

List-A Series

1st Unofficial ODI

2nd Unofficial ODI

3rd Unofficial ODI

Twenty20 series

1st Unofficial T20

2nd Unofficial T20

3rd Unofficial T20

4th Unofficial T20

5th Unofficial T20

References

A team cricket
2022 in Zimbabwean cricket
2022 in South African cricket